Lee Moon-sik (born November 13, 1967) is a South Korean actor. Lee Moon-sik debuted in Jang Jin films of the late 1990s after an illustrious career in Daehak-ro (considered the "Korean Broadway"), where he learned great comic timing, ad-lib prowess, and dramatic acting. He has since become one of South Korea's most prolific supporting actors, appearing in numerous films and television series throughout his career. Among Lee's leading roles are in Mapado, The 101st Proposal, Detective Mr. Gong, A Bloody Aria, Fly, Daddy, Fly, and Here He Comes.

Filmography

Film

Television series

Web series

Television shows

Awards 
 2013 Seoul International Drama Awards: Best Actor (Sangkwoni)
 2011 Golden Cinematography Awards: Most Popular Actor (Battlefield Heroes)
 2008 SBS Drama Awards: Best Supporting Actor in a Drama Special (Iljimae)
 2008 MBC Entertainment Awards: Top Excellence Award, Actor in a Comedy/Sitcom (Here He Comes)
 2004 Korean Film Awards: Best Supporting Actor (The Big Swindle)

References

External links 
 Lee Moon-sik at Nate 
 
 
 

South Korean male film actors
South Korean male television actors
South Korean male stage actors
Hanyang University alumni
People from Busan
1967 births
Living people